Bristol Youth Strike 4 Climate (abbreviated as BYS4C) is an environmental advocacy group that was established in February 2019. in response to the international Fridays for Future and Youth Strike 4 Climate movements. Run by a team of student volunteers aged 14 to 24, the group have organised 10 climate strikes as of September 2020, calling for climate justice and drawing attention to the climate and ecological crisis.

Demands

BYS4C's website, as of December 2020, states the following demands: 
 Ensure air pollution across Bristol is at or below the legal limit.
 Free bus travel for under 18s and students.
 Pedestrianise roads in the city centre.
 2021 Bristol Mayoral candidates must have a two term plan for 2030 carbon neutrality.
 Increased retrofitting of houses and clear regulations to ensure new builds adhere to 2030 carbon neutrality.

Bristol Airport Expansion 
In April 2019, the group started a campaign against the proposed Bristol Airport expansion which continued until the airport's planning permission was declined by North Somerset Council in February 2020.

20 September 2019 Global Strike 
On 20 September 2019, BYS4C  took part in the Global Strike 4 Climate which was the biggest ever worldwide climate protest. The event reportedly drew crowds of 15,000 with 4 million protestors taking to the streets globally.

28 February 2020 'Greta Thunberg' strike 
On 28 February 2020, the group became the only UK-based climate strike group to host Greta Thunberg. The protest was organised in just under a week due to short notice, with an estimated 30,000 people joining the group to call for climate action. Despite the limited organisation time and public concern over safety, the event proceeded without any major incidents and organisers were praised by both the authorities and Greta Thunberg's team for their ability to host such a large event with minimal resources. The protest resulted in some controversy as College Green, the location of the protest, became very muddy due to the high footfall and wet weather conditions. However, despite claims that Bristol City Council would have to pay to replace the grass and a GoFundMe page started to cover these costs, the grass regrew within a week with no intervention.

References 

Organisations based in Bristol
2019 protests
2020 protests
Demonstrations
Environmental organisations based in the United Kingdom
Environmental protests in the United Kingdom
Climate change organizations
2019 establishments in the United Kingdom
Student organisations in the United Kingdom
2019 establishments in England